St. Sebastian's Cathedral , also called the Cathedral of the Military Ordinariate, is the name given to a Catholic church in Bratislava, which since 2009 ha been the cathedral of the Military Ordinariate of Slovakia.

The first stone church was laid in 1995 and was consecrated in 2003 by Pope John Paul II. However, construction did not begin until the spring of 2007, after it could issue the permit to build in January 2007. The project architect was Ladislav Banhegyi. The roof was built in 2008. The work inside lasted until the summer of 2009. On June 13, 2009, took place the consecration ceremony, presided over by Bishop Stanislav Zvolensky.

See also
Roman Catholicism in Slovakia
St. Sebastian's Church

References

Roman Catholic cathedrals in Slovakia
Roman Catholic churches in Bratislava
21st-century Roman Catholic church buildings in Slovakia
Roman Catholic churches completed in 2009
Cathedrals of military ordinariates